Tribunale will be a station on Line 1 of the Naples Metro and will rise in Via Domenico Aulisio. The previous station will be Centro Direzionale, while the next one will be Poggioreale.

Services 
The station has:

  Passing bus and tram stop

Notes 

Naples Metro stations
Railway stations in Italy opened in the 21st century